Nerva is a town and municipality located in the province of Huelva, southern Spain.

References

External links
Nerva - Sistema de Información Multiterritorial de Andalucía

Twin towns — Sister cities
Nerva is twinned with:
 Narva, Estonia

Municipalities in the Province of Huelva